The 1948 Penn Quakers football team was an American football team that represented the University of Pennsylvania as an independent during the 1948 college football season. In its eleventh season under head coach George Munger, the team compiled a 5–3 record and outscored opponents 169 to 117. Home games were played on campus at Franklin Field in Philadelphia.

Penn won its first five games and was seventh in the AP Poll, but lost the last three games, all at home, and fell out of the rankings. Center and linebacker Chuck Bednarik, a consensus All-American, was third in the balloting for the Heisman Trophy.

Schedule

References

Penn
Penn Quakers football seasons
Penn Quakers football